Bijl or Byl is a Dutch surname. "Bijl" means "axe" in Dutch, and the name may be a metonymic occupational surname referring to a butcher or lumberjack. It can also be of Matronymic origin, referring to a short form of Sibylla. People with this surname include:

Glenn Bijl (born 1995), Dutch footballer
Guillaume Bijl (born 1946), Belgian installation artist
Jeroen Bijl (born 1966), Dutch volleyballplayer and chef de mission of NOC NSF
Lyn Byl (born 1979), German-British handball player
Marc Bijl (born 1970), Dutch performance and installation artist
 (1948–2019), Dutch singer, actress, writer and television presenter
Nelly Byl (1919–2011), Belgian songwriter

See also
Van der Bijl
Van der Byl

References

Dutch-language surnames
Matronymic surnames
Occupational surnames